Petit-Couronne is a commune in the Seine-Maritime department in the Normandy region in northern France.

Geography

Coat of arms

Population

Places of interest
 Menhirs from pre-Roman times.
 The church of St. Aubin, dating from the seventeenth century.
 The sixteenth-century house of writer Pierre Corneille, now a museum.
 Several 17th/18th-century houses and a dovecote.

People
 Pierre Corneille, writer, poet and dramatist once lived here.
 Marcelly, full name Marcel Jules Turmel, Music-hall singer (1882-1966)
 Germaine Beaumont, writer and journalist, was born here.

Twin towns
  Ahlem, Hanover, Germany
  Beccles, England
  Vila Verde, Portugal

See also
Communes of the Seine-Maritime department

References

External links

Official town website 
Website of the Museum of Pierre Corneille 

Communes of Seine-Maritime